Dwayne Orville Andreas (March 4, 1918 – November 16, 2016), was one of the leading farm industrialists of the 20th century.   
He was former CEO and chairman of Archer Daniels Midland (ADM). Under his leadership he turned ADM into the largest processor of farm commodities in the United States.

Early life 
Andreas was born in Worthington, Minnesota, to Ruben and Lydia (Stoltz) Andreas.  He grew up mostly in Iowa (with siblings Albert, Lenore, Glen, Osborne and Lowell) and attended Wheaton College in Illinois, but dropped out in his sophomore year after getting married, and went to work for a modest, family-owned food-processing firm in Cedar Rapids, Iowa. When Cargill bought the Cedar Rapids facility in 1945, Andreas joined the commodity firm, eventually becoming a vice president. Andreas resigned from Cargill in 1952, and continued in the vegetable oil business, eventually as an executive of the Grain Terminal Association.

Business career 
In 1965 Andreas purchased 100,000 shares of Archer Daniels for $3.3 million. Over the following years Andreas gradually increased his holding and his influence in the company, eventually becoming chief executive officer of ADM in 1971.

He is credited with transforming the firm into an industrial powerhouse. Under his leadership, ADM grew from 40 processing plants and about 3,000 employees in the Midwest to 274 processing plants with 23,000 workers around the world. Its soybean exports shot up from $1.5 billion to $7 billion.  Andreas remained CEO until 1997.  He stepped down as chairman in 1999.

Public service 

In 1961, president John F. Kennedy appointed Andreas to the Food for Peace Committee.

On March 26, 1965, president Lyndon B. Johnson appointed Andreas to The General Advisory Committee on Foreign Assistance Programs.

In May 1983, President Ronald Reagan appointed Andreas chairman of the President's International Private Enterprise Task Force, whose charter was to advise the president, the director of the United States International Development Cooperation Agency, and the administrator of the Agency for International Development with respect to the role private enterprise can play in the implementation of programs and activities under the Foreign Assistance Act of 1961, as amended.

Andreas served as vice chairman of the Board of Trustees of the Woodrow Wilson International Center for Scholars.

In 1986 Andreas agreed, at the request of retired Chief Justice Warren E. Burger, to serve as head of the Foundation for the Commemoration of the United States Constitution which supported the work of the Commission on the Bicentennial of the United States Constitution.

In the 1990s he contributed $2.5 million to Florida public broadcasting network WXEL. He also aided the Community Partnership for the Homeless.

In 1997 Andreas donated $2.2 million to the Miami Homeless Assistance Center, saying "The one thing that is more gratifying than successfully making money is giving it away to a wonderful cause."

Andreas was one of several signatories to a May 20, 2004, open letter exhorting President George W. Bush to lift travel and humanitarian aid restrictions on Cuba. He is the namesake of Barry University's Dwayne O. Andreas School of Law.

Awards and honors 
 1993 International Rescue Committee Freedom Award
 1994 Horatio Alger Award
 1994 National Agri-Marketing Association Agribusiness Leader of the Year

Politics 
Andreas was one of the most prominent political campaign donors in the United States, having contributed millions of dollars to Democratic and Republican candidates alike.

While not well known to the public, Andreas commanded much respect among Washington politicians for his largesse.  As part of the investigations surrounding illegal campaign fundraising linked to the Watergate scandal, Andreas was charged with (but acquitted of) illegally contributing $100,000 to Hubert Humphrey's 1968 presidential campaign.  In 1972 Andreas unlawfully contributed $25,000 to President Nixon's re-election campaign via Watergate burglar Bernard Barker.  Other recipients of Andreas's "tithing" — as he puts it — have included George H. W. Bush, Jimmy Carter, Bill Clinton, Bob Dole, Michael Dukakis, Jesse Jackson, and Jack Kemp.

According to Mother Jones magazine:
During the 1992 election, Andreas gave more than $1.4 million in soft money and $345,000 to individual candidates, using multiple donors in his company and family members (including wife Inez) to circumvent contribution limits.

Andreas was implicated in the financial scandal of the Orthodox Church in America for his donations to Russia in 1991.

One of his closest friends was former New York governor and two-time Republican presidential candidate, Thomas E. Dewey.  It was Andreas who discovered his friend following Dewey's fatal heart attack in his room at Seaview, a Florida, Hotel in which Andreas held partial ownership.

Andreas was portrayed by Tom Smothers in the 2009 film The Informant! about the lysine price-fixing conspiracy.

Personal life 
In 1935, at age 17, Andreas married Bertha Benedict in Florida. They had a daughter but subsequently divorced. In 1947, Andreas married Inez Snyder in Minneapolis, Minnesota. She was a single mother of a daughter.  Andreas and Inez had a son Michael whose godfather was Hubert Humphrey.  Humphrey was a friend and political mentor to Andreas. For many years they lived in the Decatur, Illinois, area and after retirement moved to Bal Harbour, Florida. Andreas died on November 16, 2016, in Decatur, Illinois, at the age of 98.

On January 26, 2022, Andreas' granddaughter Regan Andreas Deering, announced her candidacy for the newly formed Illinois's 13th congressional district.

References

Further reading
 Kahn, E. J. Jr. (1991) Supermarketer to the World: The Story of Dwayne Andreas CEO of Archer Daniels Midland, New York Grand Central Publishing, Veteran New Yorker writer Kahn profiles Illinois philanthropic agri-industrialist Dwayne O. Andreas, 73, whose Archer Daniels Midland international food company grosses $5 billion a year in corn, wheat, soybeans and such by-products as ethanol and degradable plastics.

External links

Dwayne O. Andreas- 1994 Horatio Alger Award Recipient

1918 births
2016 deaths
American chief executives of food industry companies
American political fundraisers
Archer Daniels Midland people
People from Decatur, Illinois
Businesspeople from Illinois
20th-century American businesspeople
American chairpersons of corporations